The 1989 Invercargill mayoral election was held on 14 October 1989 as part of the 1989 New Zealand local elections, and was conducted under the First Past the Post system. It was the first election in Invercargill to include postal voting.

Incumbent mayor Eve Poole was re-elected with a reduced majority.

Results
The following table gives the election results:

References

1989 elections in New Zealand
Mayoral elections in Invercargill
October 1989 events in New Zealand